Events in the year 1977 in Turkey.

Parliament
 15th Parliament of Turkey (up to 5 June)
 16th Parliament of Turkey

Incumbents
President – Fahri Korutürk
Prime Minister 
 Süleyman Demirel (up to 21 June 1977)
Bülent Ecevit (21 June 1977 – 21 July 1977)
Süleyman Demirel (from 21 July 1977)
Leader of the opposition 
Bülent Ecevit (up to 21 June 1977)
Süleyman Demirel (21 June 1977 – 21 July 1977)
Bülent Ecevit (from 21 July 1977)

Ruling party and the main opposition
Ruling party – 
Justice Party (AP) and the coalition partners (up to 21 June 1977)  
Republican People's Party (CHP) (21 June 1977 – 21 July 1977)
Justice Party (AP) and coalition partners National Salvation Party (MSP), and Nationalist Movement Party (MHP) (from 21 July) – This government is sometimes called 2.MC

 Main opposition
Republican People's Party (CHP) (up to 21 June 1977)
Justice Party (AP) (21 June 1977 – 21 July 1977)
Republican People's Party (CHP) (from 21 July 1977)

Cabinet
39th government of Turkey (up to 21 June 1977)  
40th government of Turkey (21 June 1977 – 21 July 1977)
41st government of Turkey (from 21 July 1977)

Events
 3 January – Kirkuk-Iskenderun pipeline officially opens.
 19 March – A Turkish aircraft hijacked to Beirut, Lebanon
 1 May – Thirty-seven dead in May Day rally in Istanbul.
 3 June – Trabzonspor wins the championship.
 5 June – General elections. (CHP 213 seats, AP 180 seats, MSP 24 seats, MHP 16 seats, CGP 3 seats, DP 1 seat)
 14 August – Turkey claims Greece violated international treaties by militarizing Aegean islands.

Births
1 January – Zeynep Tokuş actress
2 January – Ahu Türkpençe actress
3 August – Deniz Akkaya, model and actress
20 December – Kerem Kabadayı, drummer and songwriter 
26 December – Fatih Akyel,  footballer

Deaths
24 February – Yorgo Bacanos, musician
10 July – Şükrü Gülesin, former footballer
21 October – Ferit Tüzün,  composer
14 December – Oğuz Atay, novelist

Gallery

See also
 1976–77 1.Lig
 List of Turkish films of 1977

References

 
Years of the 20th century in Turkey
Turkey
Turkey